The 2021 COSAFA U-17 Women's Championship was a part of the Region 5 Games Maseru 2020, and was the third edition of the COSAFA U-17 Women's Championship. The tournament took place in Setsoto Stadium in Maseru, Lesotho on December 2–6.

Participants
The championship was played by players born 2007-2005. All 14 COSAFA nation's U17 teams as well as Reunion were allowed to enter the tournament, out of which three finally participated.

Group stage
The group stage was played in a round-robin where all 3 teams played once against each other and where the top two teams advanced to the final.

Final

Top Scorers

COSAFA-La Liga partnership
For the second time, COSAFA awarded players for a football experience in Spain. This time Zambia's Pumulo Lubasi where selected to be traveling to Spain after awarded player of the tournament, for a LaLiga development experience, where they will get the opportunity to observe the football life in Spain and train with a local team.

Changes due to COVID-19
Many changes had to be done because of the Covid-19 pandemic and travel difficulties because of it, with many teams withdrawals.

References

External links
 Official website

COSAFA Under-17 Championship
2021 in African football
COSAFA Women's U17